The Hermitage is a historic plantation house located near Merry Hill, Bertie County, North Carolina. It consists of a -story, side hall plan Georgian style rear wing with a -story, five bay, Federal style addition.  Also on the property are the contributing gable roof smokehouse and a two-room
structure dating from the Greek Revival period.

It was added to the National Register of Historic Places in 1982.

The owners of the plantation were Alexander W. Mebane (1800-1847) and Augustus Holley (1820-1882).

References

Plantation houses in North Carolina
Houses on the National Register of Historic Places in North Carolina
Greek Revival houses in North Carolina
Georgian architecture in North Carolina
Federal architecture in North Carolina
Houses in Bertie County, North Carolina
National Register of Historic Places in Bertie County, North Carolina